The Great White Man of Lambaréné (Le grand blanc de Lambaréné) is a 1995 biopic of Albert Schweitzer by the Cameroonian filmmaker Bassek Ba Kobhio. 
The film, made on the site of Schweitzer's hospital at Lambaréné on the Ogooué River in Gabon, has received critical attention as a post-colonial re-interrogation of the myth of Schweitzer.

References

External links
 

1995 films
Cameroonian drama films
1990s biographical films
Biographical films about physicians